The Museum of Philistine Culture is an archaeological museum in Ashdod (Israel). The museum is dedicated to the culture of the Philistines, the ancient people who inhabited the maritime part of Israel from the XII century BC. It is the only museum in the world completely dedicated to the Philistine people.

The museum has a permanent exhibition showing archaeological finds, as well as temporary exhibitions. Cultural events are held for visitors; in particular, they can try on clothes similar to those worn by the ancient Philistines, and try the dishes of their cuisine.

In 1990, the Museum of Philistine Culture became the first museum to open in Ashdod.

Gallery

References

External links

 Corinne Mamane Museum of Philistine Culture homepage, archived copy (2014)
 Museum of Philistine Culture at Museums in Israel – the National Portal, active 2020

Archaeological museums in Israel
Museums of Ancient Near East in Israel
Philistines
Ashdod
Buildings and structures in Ashdod
Museums established in 1990
1990 establishments in Israel